Nile Breweries is the name of several organizations, including:
Nile Breweries Limited, a Uganda brewery
Nile Breweries FC, a Ugandan football club